Convolvulus aschersonii is a species of plant in the family Convolvulaceae. It is native to much of continental Africa as well as Madagascar.

References

aschersonii
Flora of Angola
Flora of Botswana
Flora of Burundi
Flora of the Cape Provinces
Flora of Chad
Flora of Eritrea
Flora of Ethiopia
Flora of Kenya
Flora of KwaZulu-Natal
Flora of Lesotho
Flora of Madagascar
Flora of Malawi
Flora of Mozambique
Flora of Namibia
Flora of Nigeria
Flora of Rwanda
Flora of Saudi Arabia
Flora of Somalia
Flora of Sudan
Flora of Swaziland
Flora of Tanzania
Flora of Uganda
Flora of Yemen
Flora of Zambia
Flora of the Democratic Republic of the Congo
Flora of Zimbabwe